The Man with the Glass Eye (German: Der Mann mit dem Glasauge) is a 1969 West German crime film directed by Alfred Vohrer and starring Horst Tappert, Karin Hübner and Hubert von Meyerinck. It is part of Rialto Film's long-running series of Edgar Wallace adaptations.

The film's sets were designed by the art directors Walter Kutz and Wilhelm Vorwerg. It was shot at the Spandau Studios and on location in West Berlin, Hamburg and London.

Cast

References

Bibliography 
 Bergfelder, Tim. International Adventures: German Popular Cinema and European Co-Productions in the 1960s. Berghahn Books, 2005.

External links 
 

1969 films
1960s mystery thriller films
German mystery thriller films
West German films
1960s German-language films
Films directed by Alfred Vohrer
Constantin Film films
Films set in London
Films shot in London
Films based on British novels
Films based on works by Edgar Wallace
Films shot at Spandau Studios
1960s German films